Uruguayans in Spain are people born in Uruguay who emigrated to Spain. As of 2022, there are over 80,000 Uruguayans living in Spain, mostly in Catalonia.

Overview
Two centuries ago, Uruguay used to be part of the Spanish Empire. Since attaining independence, Uruguay has always considered Spain as the Madre Patria, and cultivated intense cultural and economical links between both countries. During the last decades of the 20th century and first years of the 21st, there have been thousands of Uruguayans travelling to live and work in Spain, many of them thanks to their Spanish passports.

During the civic-military dictatorship of Uruguay (1973-1985), some expatriates spent their exile years in Spain. There are as well a number of Spanish-born people of Uruguayan descent.

As of 2011, there were over 40,000 Uruguayans living in Spain. Current data put the figure of Uruguayans in Spain at 80,000.

Expatriate Uruguayans have their own associations in Spain, notably the Uruguayan Center of Madrid and several Consultative Councils. Official information consider that there are at least 50 Uruguayan-run organizations in Spain.

Notable people

Past
Mario Benedetti (1920-2009), poet and writer
Elio García-Austt (1919-2005), neuroscientist
Eduardo Galeano (1940-2015), writer
Juan Carlos Onetti (1909-1994), writer
Alfredo Zitarrosa (1936-1984), singer-songwriter
Present
Jorge Drexler, musician
Narciso Ibáñez Serrador, theater director and screenwriter
Jordi César López Delgado, footballer
Diego Meijide, footballer
Cristina Peri Rossi, writer and translator
Carmen Posadas, writer

See also
Emigration from Uruguay
Spain–Uruguay relations
Spanish Uruguayan

References

Immigration to Spain
Ethnic groups in Spain
 
Spain